Francisca Kakra Forson (born 21 March1987) is a leading Ghanaian female media personality, freelance journalist, and a Gender Advocate.

Career 
She has worked with notable media organizations like Joy FM , BBC, VOA & Metro TV.

In May 2017, she was named alongside Ameyaw Debrah, Manifest, Gary Al-Smith and MzVee as the United Nations International Children's Emergency Fund (UNICEF) influencers for Ghana's Equality Campaign, "Let's Be Fair" which threw light on the plight of about 3,600,000 million people lacking basic opportunities across the country.

Awards

Nominations 
She was nominated for the 2021 RTP Awards.

References 

Living people
Ghanaian journalists
1987 births